Ally Stacher (born June 6, 1987) is an American professional racing cyclist.

See also
 2014 Specialized–lululemon season

References

External links
 

1987 births
Living people
American female cyclists
People from Siskiyou County, California
Cyclists from California
21st-century American women